MS Svea may refer to the following motor ships:

 , a ferry operated by Rederi AB Svea 1966–1969
 , a cruiseferry operated by Silja Line 1985–1992

Ship names